The Culebra Formation (Tcb) is a geologic formation in Panama. It preserves fossils dating back to the Miocene period; Early Miocene epoch, Aquitanian to Burdigalian stages (Late Arikareean to Hemingfordian in the NALMA classification). Fossils of Culebrasuchus have been found in and named after the formation.

Fossil content 
 Culebrasuchus mesoamericanus
 Culebratherium alemani
 Dentimides
 Panamacebus transitus
 Paratoceras orarius
 Purussaurus
 Podocnemididae indet.

See also 
 List of fossiliferous stratigraphic units in Panama
 Cucaracha Formation
 Gatún Formation

References

Bibliography

Further reading 
 B. J. MacFadden, M. X. Kirby, A. Rincon, C. Montes, S. Moron, N. Strong, and C. Jaramillo. 2010. Extinct peccary "Cynorca" occidentale (Tayassuidae, Tayassuinae) from the Miocene of Panama and correlations to North America. Journal of Paleontology 84(2):288-298
 C. Pimiento, G. González Barba, A.J.W. Hendy, C. Jaramillo, B. J. MacFadden, C. Montes, S. C. Suarez and M. Shippritt. 2013. Early Miocene chondrichthyans from the Culebra Formation Panama A window into marine vertebrate faunas before closure the Central American Seaway. Journal of South American Earth Sciences 42:159-170

Geologic formations of Panama
Arikareean
Hemingfordian
Neogene Panama
Aquitanian (stage)
Burdigalian
Sandstone formations
Limestone formations
Mudstone formations
Shale formations
Siltstone formations
Conglomerate formations
Coal formations
Lagoonal deposits
Reef deposits
Shallow marine deposits
Paleontology in Panama
Formations
Formations